Shoryyv is a rural locality (a village) in Beloyevskoye Rural Settlement, Kudymkarsky District, Perm Krai, Russia. The population was 54 as of 2010.

Geography 
Shoryyv is located 12 km northwest of Kudymkar (the district's administrative centre) by road. Mosheva is the nearest rural locality.

References 

Rural localities in Kudymkarsky District